Show Me Show Me is a pre-school television series that aired on CBeebies from 6 July 2009 to 30 October 2015 and is presented by Chris Jarvis and Pui Fan Lee. The series teaches and shows children to read stories about their toys.

Characters 
The show features five toys: Mo Mo, Tom, Stuffy, Miss Mouse, and Teddington, each of which appears in their own song as well as in a storybook adventure.
 Stuffy – A felt cube with orange hair and a pocket at the back
 Mo Mo – A girl robot with a poseable head and arms
 Miss Mouse – A knitted mouse with a red dotted headband
 Tom – A boy rag doll with brown hair
 Teddington – A teddy bear with a green waistcoat and black bow-tie

In Series 1, a cartoon series produced by TV-Loonland AG called Penelope featuring a blue koala appeared in episodes, and was later split off on its own show.

In Series 2, another cartoon series called Uki was featured, about an eponymous little yellow character who conveys emotions through laughter and smiles. As with Penelope, this was eventually split off onto its own series.

Format 
The show takes place on the top floor of a tower and each episode begins by climbing the ten-storey tower block lift where a child's voice counts from one to ten. On reaching ten we enter Chris and Pui's play room where a magical world of fun and games is explored.

Each show centres on two items that form the title of the episode (for example "Granddads and Glasses"), each of which is introduced by a child requesting "Show me show me granddads". Chris and Pui then explore the items via videos, songs and activities, as well as a piece in which children talk about their experiences with that item.

Shows often feature one of the characters' songs, or a story read by one of the presenters about the exploits of the toys.

Most episodes contain a sequence of a shop. If Chris runs it, Pui comes as different nursery rhyme characters such as the Grand Old Duke of York, Little Bo Peep, Incy Wincy Spider, Little Miss Muffet, Old MacDonald, Granny Humpty and Twinkle Twinkle Little Star. If Pui runs it, Chris enters as one of Humpty Dumpty, the Hey Diddle cow, Jack from "Jack and Jill", Pat the Baker, or Wee Willie Winkie.

The format of the show is similar to that of Play School – the BBC programme from the '60s, '70s and '80s.

Transmissions

Series

Seaside

Specials

Controversy 
On 7 September 2016, cast member Chris Jarvis was alleged to have used profanity during a song about kites, sparking outrage among parents and resulting in the CBeebies Facebook page releasing a statement saying "It's kite everyone, kite! We make shows for your little ones so it's always going to be kite."

References 

2009 British television series debuts
2015 British television series endings
2000s preschool education television series
2010s preschool education television series
BBC children's television shows
British preschool education television series
CBeebies
Television series by BBC Studios
Television shows shot at BBC Elstree Centre
English-language television shows